Downham Town Football Club is a football club based in Downham Market, Norfolk, England.

History
The club was established in 1881, and were originally nicknamed the Saints. They initially played in junior leagues in the King's Lynn area, before joining the Peterborough & District League in 1949, when they gained senior status after being elected to the league's Premier Division. In 1961–62 they won the Peterborough Senior Cup, which they retained the following year, also winning the Peterborough & District league title. In 1963–64 they won the Norfolk Senior Cup, winning it again two years later. Further victories in the Peterborough Senior Cup came in 1966–67, 1971–72 and 1986–87, whilst the league title was won in 1973–74, 1978–79. Following back-to-back titles in 1986–87 and 1987–88, the club became founding members of the new Division One of the Eastern Counties League in 1988, where they have remained since. Their best league performance was third place in 1998–99.

They began entering the FA Vase in 1979, reaching the third round in 1986–87, which remains their best performance in the competition.

Ground
The club plays at the Memorial Field, which is shared with the local cricket club. As a result, the ground only has three sides with hardstanding; one touchline features a seated main stand and two covered standing areas, with the area behind both goals consisting of hardstanding.

Honours
Peterborough & District League
Champions 1962–63, 1973–74, 1978–79, 1986–87, 1987–88
Norfolk Senior Cup
Winners 1963–64, 1965–66
Norfolk Primary Cup
Winners 1990–91
Peterborough Senior Cup
Winners 1961–62, 1962–63, 1966–67, 1971–72, 1986–87
Isle of Ely Challenge Cup
Winners 1985–86, 1987–88
Harry Overland Cup
Winners 1996–97, 1998–99
West Norfolk Cup
Winners 1987–88
Bill Knott Trophy
Winners 1989–90, 1991–92

Records
Best FA Vase performance: Third round, 1986–87
Attendance: 1,500 vs. Norwich City, 1948–49, friendly match

See also
Downham Town F.C. players

References

External links
Official website

Football clubs in England
Football clubs in Norfolk
Association football clubs established in 1881
1881 establishments in England
Peterborough and District Football League
Eastern Counties Football League